Events of 2020 in Chile.

Incumbents 
 President: Sebastián Piñera (RN)

Events

January
 January 1  – Eye injury in the 2019–2020 Chilean protests: in two separate incidents two men were permanently blinded in one of their eyes as result of being hit by tear gas grenades shot by Chilean riot police.

March
 March 21 – Ministry of Health reports its country's first COVID-19 death in an 83-year woman from Renca Santiago.
 March 24 – Easter Island records its first case of COVID-19.
Late March: first puma sightings of 2020 in Santiago

April
 April 21 – Protests against the Chilean government in commemoration of the International Workers' Day are suppressed by the police, citing social distancing laws established due to the coronavirus pandemic.
 April 28 – Bolivia and Chile agree on a deal to return home hundreds of Bolivian migrants stranded at a makeshift camp in Santiago. The migrants were transported to Iquique where they spent 14 days in quarantine before finally returning to Bolivia.

May
 May 18 – Protests against the government resume in Santiago due to food shortages in the poorest neighborhoods of the city created by the lockdown to control the COVID-19 pandemic.

June
 June 13
 More than 3,100 deaths are officially reported in the country. However, an investigation reported the Ministry of Health told the World Health Organization that the death toll reached 5,000 cases.
 Enrique Paris replaces Jaime Mañalich as Minister for Health.

Deaths

See also
 	

 		
 2019 Chilean protests
 2020 Chilean national plebiscite
 2020 Summer Olympics
 2020 Summer Paralympics

References

 
2020s in Chile
Years of the 21st century in Chile
Chile
Chile